Yaritagua is the capital of the Peña Municipality of Venezuela's state of Yaracuy. 
It has a population of around 120,000, and is considered Yaracuy's second city, after the capital San Felipe.

Founded in 1699 during Spain's colonization of Venezuela by Nicolas Eugenio de Ponte, it retains some colonial-era buildings. The significance of sugar cane in the area has given it the nickname Ciudad Dulce de Yaracuy (Sweet City of Yaracuy). 
The city is twinned with Zamora, Spain.

References

External links 

 Peña municipality

Cities in Yaracuy
Populated places established in 1699
1699 establishments in the Spanish Empire